William James Duffy (November 21, 1888 – January 18, 1946) was a Canadian provincial politician.

Born in South Durham, Quebec, Duffy was the member of the Legislative Assembly of Quebec for Compton from 1931 to 1935 and 1939 to 1946.

References

1888 births
1946 deaths
People from Centre-du-Québec
Quebec Liberal Party MNAs